Kyogle sexfoveatus is a beetle in the Staphylinidae family, native to Tasmania.

It was first described by Arthur Mills Lea in 1911 as Macroplectus sexfoveatus, from a male specimen collected in Tasmania.

Description
Lea described Macroplectus sexfoveatus as:

References

External links
Kyogle sexfoveatus images & occurrence data from GBIF

Kyogle sexfoveatus
Fauna of Tasmania
Taxa named by Arthur Mills Lea
Beetles described in 1911